Todor Dimitrov Pavlov (Bulgarian: Тодор Димитров Павлов; 14 February 1890 in Štip, Kosovo Vilayet, Ottoman Empire – 8 May 1977, Sofia, Bulgaria) was a Bulgarian Marxist philosopher, politician, journalist and leading member of the Bulgarian Communist Party. 

He was one of the three regents for the underage Simeon II from 1944 to 1946. From 1947 to 1962 he was the president of the Bulgarian Academy of Sciences.

Notes

1890 births
1977 deaths
People from Štip
People from Kosovo vilayet
Regents of Bulgaria
Members of the Bulgarian Academy of Sciences
Macedonian Bulgarians
Bulgarian communists
Bulgarian Marxists
Bulgarian Communist Party politicians

20th-century Bulgarian philosophers
Foreign members of the Serbian Academy of Sciences and Arts